Thomas D'Arcy is a Canadian singer and songwriter born in Guernsey, Channel Islands.  D'Arcy's family immigrated to Toronto, Ontario in 1981. He has been a member of indie rock bands The Carnations, All Systems Go!, Small Sins, Another Blue Door, The I-Spies, BROS., k-os, Tommy Hawkins and Major Maker, among others. He is a graduate of philosophy from the University of Toronto.

Artist career
In 1995, D'Arcy and three high school friends formed  The Carnations, with D'Arcy as lead singer and principal songwriter.  The band played in nightclubs its members were not old enough to get into (due to the legal drinking age in Ontario being 19). The Carnations wrote and performed the theme song for the MuchMusic show So 90's, and were CFNY 102.1 new rock search finalists. 

The Carnations called it quits in 2004 with an announcement on their website. In 2005, D'Arcy conceived Small Sins (formerly known as The Ladies and Gentlemen) as a self-contained solo unit. D'Arcy continued to record under the Small Sins moniker until 2011, when he opted to release solo records under his own name. D'Arcy was the touring bass player for rapper k-os from 2009 to 2014.

Throughout the years, D'Arcy has been commissioned to create music for Canadian advertising campaigns, including for Telus, The Home Depot, Triscuits, Dodge, Bell Canada, Scotiabank, Coca-Cola, Honda, Quaker, Alesse, Walmart, Tetley, Hyundai, Toyota, Sunchips, McDonald's and EOS. D'Arcy has also placed music in over 100 television shows and films. In 2016, D'Arcy provided the musical score for the CBC web series 'My 90 Year Old Roommate.' D'Arcy also wrote and performed the theme song for the CBC children's show 'Ollie: The Boy Who Became What He Ate.'

In 2012, D'Arcy recorded a cover record of the entire Bad Habits album by UK band The Monks. Members of Sloan, The Pursuit of Happiness, Limblifter, The New Pornographers, Change of Heart, The Doughboys and Cursed contributed guest performances to the album, as did John Ford, an original member of the Monks.

In 2014, D'Arcy opened the studio Taurus Recording along with fellow producer/engineer Jon Drew.

In 2016, D'Arcy self-recorded, wrote and produced a six song collaboration with Hawksley Workman under the name Tommy Hawkins called 'Amy.' In 2016, D'Arcy signed a publishing deal with Arts and Crafts records. In 2019, D'Arcy was nominated for a JUNO for Jack Richardson Producer of the Year.

In 2021, D'Arcy revived his pet project, Small Sins with a new 8 song album called 'Volume II'. An alternate orchestral version of the album was also released in April. 2021.

Producer/engineer credits

Artist discography

The Carnations
 1997: Superluminal
 1998: The Carnations / The Persuasion Split single 7"
 1999: A Return to Melody
 2000: The Carnations / Nero Split single 7"
 2001: The Carnations
 2003: In Good Time

Small Sins
 2006: Small Sins
 2007: Mood Swings
 2007: The Mellow EP
 2010: Pot Calls Kettle Black

Thomas D'Arcy
 2012: Tribute to the Monks: Bad Habits
 2013: What We Want (Thomas D'Arcy Music / MapleMusic Recordings)
 2013: The Price You Pay EP
 2013: I Wake Up Every Day EP
 2014: Songs For A Film That Does Not Exist
 2015: Fooled You Twice
 2016: Amy (as Tommy Hawkins)
 2019: Return to Wherever (credited for his vocals on the track "All Night Together")

References

External links
 Small Sins Official Website
 Small Sins on Myspace

Living people
Guernsey musicians
Canadian male singer-songwriters
Canadian record producers
Canadian indie rock musicians
Musicians from Toronto
Date of birth missing (living people)
Year of birth missing (living people)